Laffrey is a commune in the Isère department in southeastern France. It stands at the top of the Rampe de Laffrey, which is known for a large number of deadly automobile accidents.

History

Napoleon passed through the village on March 7, 1815, during his return from Elba at the beginning of the Hundred Days. At a site in Laffrey now known as the "field of the encounter" (prairie de la Rencontre), Napoleon and the handful of troops accompanying him were met by a battalion of soldiers of the royal 5th Regiment of the Line, who had come to arrest him. Leaving behind his men, Napoleon presented himself to the soldiers and declared, "If any of you will shoot his Emperor, here I am". The soldiers defected to his cause, crying Vive l'Empereur! ("Long live the Emperor!"). An equestrian statue of Napoleon by Emmanuel Frémiet, installed on the field in 1930, commemorates this event.

Population

See also 
 Communes of the Isère department
 Rampe de Laffrey
 Grand lac de Laffrey
 Route Napoléon

References

Communes of Isère
Isère communes articles needing translation from French Wikipedia